Templetuohy is a village in North Tipperary.

Templetuohy may also refer to:
 Templetouhy (civil parish), which includes the village
 Templetouhy and Moyne (parish), a parish in the Roman Catholic Archdiocese of Cashel and Emly
 Moyne-Templetuohy GAA, a sporting club organised by Tipperary GAA